Stade Omnisport Marien Ngouabi d'Owando is a multi-use stadium in Owando, Republic of the Congo.  It is used for football matches and serves as the home of AC Léopard of the Congo Premier League. It holds 13,037 people and opened in 2009.

References

Football venues in the Republic of the Congo
Stade Omnisport Marien Ngouabi d'Owando
Sports venues completed in 2009
2009 establishments in the Republic of the Congo